Iván Enderica Ochoa (born 28 October 1991 in Cuenca) is an Ecuadorian professional swimmer, specialising in open water swimming. He competed at the 2012 Summer Olympics, finishing in 21st in the 10 km open water marathon.  He started swimming at 5, following in the footsteps of his older brother Gabriel, and began to train under his first coach, Rafael Maldonado, when he was eight.  He took up open water swimming in 2009.

References

1991 births
Living people
Ecuadorian male swimmers
Male long-distance swimmers
Olympic swimmers of Ecuador
Swimmers at the 2012 Summer Olympics
Swimmers at the 2016 Summer Olympics

People from Cuenca, Ecuador